The following is a list of notable Sindhi people who have origins in the Sindh province.

Businesspeople 
 Bhai Pratap Dialdas
 Chandru Raheja
 Deepak Perwani
 Gulu Lalvani
 Hari Harilela
 Kabir Mulchandani
 Kishinchand Chellaram
 Lal Chand, Engineer
 Lila Poonawalla
 Mahmoud Haroon 
 Micky Jagtiani
 Niranjan Hiranandani
 Ram Buxani
 Romesh Wadhwani
 S. P. Hinduja  
 Sabeer Bhatia
 Sanjeev Bikhchandani
 Seth Vishandas Nihalchand
 Sital K Motwani
 Sonu Shivdasani
 Surendra Hiranandani
 Sultana Siddiqui
 Sunil Vaswani
 Tarun Tahiliani 
 Vijay K. Thadani
 Sunder Genomal
 Lachman Ludhani

Educationalists

Entertainment industry

Indian

Pakistani

Historical personalities

Journalists

Law and judiciary

Poets

Politicians and civil servants

Religious leaders and scholars

Science, medicine and technology

Singers

Social activists

Sportspeople

Writers

Others

See also 
 List of Sindhi-language films
 Sindhi languages
 List of Sindhi-language newspapers
 List of Sindhi-language television channels
 Sindhi-language media
 List of Sindhi festivals
 Sindhi Americans#Notable people

History of Sindh
Sindhi